Štefan Lux (4 November 1888 – 3 July 1936) was a Slovak Jewish journalist, and a Czechoslovak citizen, who committed suicide in the general assembly of the League of Nations during its session on 3 July 1936. He shot himself in order to alert the world leaders of the rising dangers of German antisemitism, expansionism, and militarism.

After shouting "C'est le dernier coup" ("This is the final blow"), he shot himself with a revolver.  In his suicide note he begged the British foreign secretary Anthony Eden to do something to stop Germany's criminal regime.   Eden was never shown the letter.  

Condemning his act, but paying tribute to his cause, the journalist Léon Savary concluded: "People bold enough to fight for justice shouldn't kill themselves, but stay at their position."

His actions were misreported by the world media at the time.

Lux was also a writer, a theater actor, and a film director, who published his work under the pseudonym Peter Sturmbusch.

He was wounded on more than one occasion during World War I.

Works 
 Under Peter Sturmbusch pseudonym:
 Meine Lieder. ; Wien, C. Konegen, 1911. 
 Drei Lieder für hohe Singstimme mit Klavierbegleitung ; Julius Rünger; Peter Sturmbusch; Ema Destinnová; Ada Negri; Mainz : B. Schott's Söhne, 1916. 
 Liebeslieder. ; Wien: Carl Konegen, 1921. 
 Nur keck : Posse mit Gesang in 3 Akten ; Johann Nestroy; Peter Sturmbusch; Wien : Interterritorialer Verlag "Renaissance" (Erdtracht) 1923. 
 As film Director:
 1920 – Gerechtigkeit

Memorials 
 Amen. a Costa-Gavras movie of 2002 begins with the suicide of Lux in Geneva.
 Corrosion of Conformity's 1994 song "Pearls Before Swine" contains audio in the first 30 seconds of Lux's pre-speech introduction to the League of Nations.

See also 
 Self-immolation, suicide for the purpose of protest

References 

 Michael Biggs ; The Transnational Diffusion of Protest by Self-Immolation ; Department of Sociology, University of Oxford (2005), p. 17–29
 Betty Sargent ; The Desperate Mission of Stefan Lux ; The Georgia review. 55, no. 4, (2001): 187 ; Athens, University of Georgia. 
  Der Opfertod von Genf : die Tat des Stephan Lux vor der Völkerbundsversammlung in the Israelitische Wochenblatt für die Schweiz 10 July 1936.
  Arnold Hahn : Vor den Augen der Welt ! Warum starb Stefan Lux ? Sein Leben, seine Tat, seine Briefe (Prag : Verlag der Cechoslovakisches Liga gegen den Antisemitismus, 1936). 
  Stefan Lux : Porqué se mató el periodista Stéfan Lux : apuntes para la historia de un mártir del siglo XX. ; Buenos Aires : Columna, 1937. 
  Rüdiger Strempel: Lux. Gegen den Nationalsozialismus und die Lethargie der Welt. Osburg Verlag, Hamburg 2020, . 
  League of Nations Archives : Registry n° 15/24650/17433.

1888 births
1936 suicides
Slovak film directors
Slovak journalists
Slovak male stage actors
Slovak Jews
League of Nations people
Suicides by firearm in Switzerland
People from Malacky
20th-century journalists
1936 deaths
German-language writers
Austro-Hungarian military personnel of World War I